Curena caustopa is a species of snout moth in the genus Curena described by Alfred Jefferis Turner in 1905. It is found in Queensland, Australia.

The wingspan is about 10 mm.

References

Moths described in 1905
Pyralini